The Johnson Fire was a wildfire that started in Gila National Forest near Gila Cliff Dwellings National Monument and the town of Silver City, New Mexico on May 20, 2021. The fire burned  and was fully contained on July 23, 2021. It was the largest wildfire in the United States of the 2021 wildfire season until June 6, 2021.

Events

May 
The Johnson Fire was first reported at around 12:00 am MDT on May 20, 2021.

June

Cause 
The cause of the fire is believed to due to a lightning strike.

Containment 
On July 23, 2021, the Johnson Fire reached 100% containment.

Impact

Closures and Evacuations 
The Johnson Fire has led to the closure of multiple trails and roads in Gila National Forest, including Royal John Rd., Black Range Crest Trail, Grandview Trail and Trujillo Trail. It has also forced the closure of State Highway 152 between the mileposts 28 and 40.

The National Park Service closed the Gila Cliff Dwellings National Monument on June 5, 2021, and will remain closed until their order is rescinded.

See also 

 2021 New Mexico wildfires
 List of New Mexico wildfires

References 

2021 New Mexico wildfires
Wildfires in New Mexico
June 2021 events in the United States
May 2021 events in the United States